Chuck-A-Rama is a chain of buffet restaurants based in Salt Lake City, Utah; as of January 2022, the company operates nine restaurants  in Utah and two in Idaho. Fare includes American comfort food. Main entrées include meats such as baked and fried chicken, carved turkey, ham, and roast beef, and mashed potatoes and gravy, among others. A salad bar is included with every meal and a rotating variety of soups are provided.

Name
The company's name was devised by Don Moss, and is a portmanteau of the word "chuckwagon" and the term "Scout-O-Rama".

Controversy
In 2004 Chuck-A-Rama gained national attention when, at its Taylorsville, Utah location, a couple following the Atkins diet were kicked out for trying to go back to the carved roast beef twelve times. The chain stated that, although they are a buffet, they are not an all-you-can-eat restaurant. However, the owners of Chuck-a-rama revised that statement and apologized to the couple.

See also
 List of buffet restaurants
 List of Utah companies

References

External links

 

1966 establishments in Utah
Companies based in Salt Lake City
Buffet restaurants
Restaurants established in 1966
Restaurants in Utah
Utah cuisine